Charles Baldwin Sedgwick (March 15, 1815 – February 3, 1883) was an American lawyer and politician from New York who served as a member of the United States House of Representatives for New York's 24th congressional district from 1859 to 1863.

Early life and education
Sedgwick, the son of Stephen Sedgwick and Anna Baldwin, was born March 15, 1815, in Pompey, New York, and attended Pompey Hill Academy and Hamilton College. He studied law, was admitted to the bar in 1848, and commenced practice in Syracuse, New York.

Career 
Sedgwick was elected as a Republican to the 36th and 37th United States Congresses, holding office from March 4, 1859, to March 3, 1863. He was chairman of the United States House Committee on Naval Affairs during the 37th Congress.

He engaged for the next two years in codifying naval laws for the United States Department of the Navy at Washington, D.C. and then resumed the practice of law in Syracuse.

On April 19, 1865, Sedgwick performed a eulogy at Hanover Square after the assassination of Abraham Lincoln.

Personal life 
State Senator Henry J. Sedgwick (1812–1868) was his brother. He died February 3, 1883, in Syracuse, New York; and was buried at the Oakwood Cemetery.

References

External links

1815 births
1883 deaths
People of New York (state) in the American Civil War
Burials at Oakwood Cemetery (Syracuse, New York)
Republican Party members of the United States House of Representatives from New York (state)
19th-century American politicians
Politicians from Syracuse, New York
Hamilton College (New York) alumni
Lawyers from Syracuse, New York
19th-century American lawyers